Hideo Shimizu (清水 英男) (fl. 1963) is a Japanese mathematician who introduced Shimizu L-functions.

References

Zeta and L-functions
20th-century Japanese mathematicians
Living people
Year of birth missing (living people)